"Just to Keep You Satisfied" is a song by soul singer Marvin Gaye. The song was the b-side to Marvin's modest 1974 hit, "You Sure Love to Ball" and was the eighth and final song issued on the singer's 1973 album, Let's Get It On.

Background
The song's progress started in 1969 when Marvin began writing his own songs and was testing the songs out on other artists, most notably second-tier acts signed to Motown including the Originals and the Monitors. The latter group recorded an early version of the song, which was originally a love ballad and featured future Temptations member Richard Street performing the lead vocals. The following year, Gaye used the original music for the Monitors version for his religious composition, "God is Love".

In 1970, Marvin re-recorded the song with a different musical background and different lyrics for the Originals, who were having hits with Gaye's compositions, "Baby I'm for Real" and "The Bells", with Hank Dixon taking most of the leads. Gaye can be obviously heard in this version first singing "oh I love you girl/oh I love my woman" and also accompanied them in the background with the refrain, "I'll keep you satisfied, satisfied" while the other Originals improvised vocals while their original background vocals of "ooh baby" were repeated. This song was produced in a proto-quiet storm format and included a false fade.

Both versions by the Monitors and the Originals weren't released as singles. In 1973, while working on his album, Let's Get It On, Gaye was going through a public separation with his wife, Anna, who was the co-writer of the original "Satisfied". Marvin had based most of the songs on Let's Get It On, on sexual and romantic relationships. For "Satisfied", he decided to re-write "Satisfied" to contrast most of the songs' subject matter in response to his collapse in his relationship with Anna. He edited out the percussion from the Originals recording and also kept just their background vocals from the 1970 version, and overdubbed mixes with his own vocals.

In an alternate version, the Originals vocals are edited completely out of the song and replaced with background vocals by Gaye. The song was featured at the end of Let's Get It On and concluded with Gaye's spoken vocals in which he says in a soft tone, "oh well, all we can do is we can both try to be happy." Like most of Gaye's ballads during this period, the song reflected the singer's doo-wop roots.

The song was covered by Kenny Lattimore on the Gaye tribute album, Marvin Is 60, and was also covered by the likes of Randy Crawford, Howard Hewett, Nancy Wilson, and longtime Marvin Gaye fan Lisa Stansfield. The original version was played during the movie Baby Boy and was sampled on Mary J. Blige's single "When We", from her Love & Life album.

Personnel

Monitors version
Lead vocals by Richard Street
Background vocals by Sandra Fagin, John "Maurice" Fagin and Warren Harris
Instrumentation by The Funk Brothers and the Detroit Symphony Orchestra

Originals version
Lead vocals by Hank Dixon, Freddie Gorman, Walter Gaines
Background vocals by Freddie Gorman, Walter Gaines, Hank Dixon, C.P. Spencer and Marvin Gaye
Instrumentation by the Funk Brothers and the Detroit Symphony Orchestra

Marvin Gaye version one
 Lead vocals by Marvin Gaye
 Background vocals by Marvin Gaye and The Originals (Freddie Gorman, Walter Gaines, Hank Dixon, C.P. Spencer)
 Instrumentation by The Funk Brothers and the Detroit Symphony Orchestra

Marvin Gaye alternate version
Lead and background vocals by Marvin Gaye
Instrumentation by the Funk Brothers and the Detroit Symphony Orchestra

1969 songs
1970 songs
1973 songs
Nancy Wilson (jazz singer) songs
Marvin Gaye songs
Songs written by Marvin Gaye
Songs written by Elgie Stover
Songs written by Anna Gordy Gaye
Song recordings produced by Marvin Gaye